Ainaro is one of 13 municipalities of East Timor, in the southwest part of the country. It has a population of 59,175 (census 2010) and an area of 804 km2. Its capital is the city of Ainaro, a small mountain town.

Etymology
The name of the municipality is derived from 'Ai Naruk', the local Mambai language word for "tall tree", and refers to a species of tree that grows in the region. Ainaro is a Portuguese approximation of Ainaru, the Mambai and Tetum derivation.

The traditional name of the region, 'Orluli', is still used today by  during ceremonies, such as the sergala, to greet important guests.

Geography
Ainaro has a great abundance of rivers and fertile terrain for agriculture. It has a coastal area, on the Timor Sea, but also mountainous zones, including the highest point in East Timor, Mount Ramelau (2,960 m), also known as Tatamailau, which lies near the border with Ermera.

The borders of the municipality are identical to that of the same in Portuguese Timor, with the following exceptions: during the Indonesian occupation, the then subdistrict of Turiscai became part of Manufahi from Ainaro, and the then subdistrict of Hato-Udo became part of Ainaro in exchange. The then subdistrict of Mape-Zumalai became part of Cova Lima in 2003.

The municipality borders Aileu to the north, Manufahi to the south, Cova Lima to the southwest, Bobonaro to the west, and Ermera to the northwest.

History
Ainaro played an important role during the brutal Indonesian occupation of East Timor, providing shelter for the mountain-based guerrilla resistance army. Former guerrilla leader and former President Xanana Gusmão spent many years directing the resistance from Ainaro.

Administrative posts
The municipality's administrative posts (formerly sub-districts) are:
Ainaro administrative post (place of capital Ainaro)
Hato-Udo Administrative Post
Hatu-Builico Administrative Post
Maubisse Administrative Post

Demographics
62.4 % of the population speaks Mambai as mother tongue, 29.1 % Tetum and 7.5 % Bunak. 400 persons are speaking Kemac. 99.1 % are Catholics, 0.9 % protestants, 0.03 % Muslim and only 19 persons are following still the traditional beliefs (census 2015).

References

Notes

Bibliography

External links 

  – official site (in Tetum with some content in English)
  – information page on Ministry of State Administration site 

 
Municipalities of East Timor